The 2020 Penrith Panthers season is the 54th season in the club's history. Coached by Ivan Cleary and captained by James Tamou, the Panthers are competing in the National Rugby League's 2020 Telstra Premiership. Due to the COVID-19 pandemic the NRL was played without fans in round 2. Shortly after the competition was suspended from 24 March until 28 May when round 3 commenced under a new draw. Crowds were allowed to return from round 5 in very small groups, whilst larger crowds were allowed from round 8. Teams were also allowed to return to their own home grounds from round 8. On the 14th of August after winning against the New Zealand Warriors, Penrith broke the club record for their longest ever winning streak with their run of 9 straight wins, continuing to 14 straight wins on the 19th of September against the North Queensland Cowboys. After Penriths 32 - 12 victory over the Cowboys in round 19, the club were crowned minor premiers of the 2020 NRL season for a third time in the clubs history. After winning by 1 point against the Sydney Roosters in the first week of the 2020 NRL Finals Series Penrith made the Preliminary final for the first time in 6 years, extending their winning streak to 16 straight. In the Preliminary final Penrith went on to win 20 - 16 against the South Sydney Rabbitohs and made their first grand final in 17 years. Penrith also extended their winning streak to 17 which is the equal highest winning streak in the NRL era alongside the Canterbury Bankstown Bulldogs. In the grand final the Panthers played the second place Melbourne Storm but came off second best. After being down 26 - 0 after 50 minutes they managed to score 20 unanswered points, finishing the match fast but falling short in the end, losing 20 - 26.

Squad

Player transfers
A † denotes that the transfer occurred during the 2019 season.

Fixtures

Pre-season

Regular season

NA = Not announced

Finals

Ladder

Other teams
In addition to competing in the National Rugby League, the Panthers are also fielding semi-professional teams in the 2020 Jersey Flegg Cup (for players aged under 20) and the New South Wales Rugby League's 2020 Canterbury Cup (NSW Cup). Due to COVID-19 however these competitions were abandoned for the 2020 season.

Representative honours

Domestic

References 

Penrith Panthers seasons
Penrith Panthers season